Sande is a railway station located in Sande, Germany. The station is located on the Oldenburg–Wilhelmshaven railway and Sande-Esens railway. The train services are operated by NordWestBahn.

Train services
The following services currently call at the station:

Regional services  Wilhelmshaven - Varel - Oldenburg - Cloppenburg - Bramsche - Osnabrück
Local services  Esens - Sande - Wilhelmshaven

References

External links 

Railway stations in Lower Saxony